Lough Dan is a scenic boomerang-shaped ribbon lake largely set on private property, in the Wicklow Mountains in Ireland. Lough Dan lake lies at the base of Luggala  and Knocknacloghoge  mountains. The lough is fed by the Cloghoge (draining Lough Tay), and Inchavore rivers, and is drained by the River Avonmore. Part of Lough Dan forms part of the Guinness Estate at Luggala, and has limited public access.

Geography

The Inchavore river flows into Lough Dan from the north-west. An outflow from Lough Tay – the Cloghoge river – feeds it from the north-east. It is drained to the south by the River Avonmore. Most of the lake is surrounded by private lands, though the north-western corner is part of the Wicklow National Park.

Scouting 

The Scouting Ireland S.A.I. national campsite, now one of several belonging to Scouting Ireland, lies beside the lake.  In 1997, Lough Dan was the site of an Irish Scouting jamboree, Lough Dan '97, at the S.A.I. national campsite, co-organised by the Federation of Irish Scouts Associations. The Jamboree was abandoned on the Thursday due to inclement weather and flooding.

In culture 
Some of the exterior scenes of 2009 Irish post-apocalyptic film One Hundred Mornings were filmed around the lake.

Gallery

See also

List of loughs of Ireland
Lists of mountains in Ireland
Wicklow Way

References

External links
Wicklow Mountains National Park page
Irelandscape section on Lough Dan
Mountain Views information about the Knocknacloghoge area
Online climbing guide to Lough Dan site

Dan
Campsites of Scouting Ireland